William Cholmeley  was an English politician who sat in the House of Commons from 1624 to 1626.

Cholmeley was the son of Sir Henry Cholmeley, of Burton Coggles, Lincolnshire. He matriculated from Magdalene College, Cambridge in Autumn 1612 and was admitted at Gray's Inn on 12  August 1614. In 1624, he was elected Member of Parliament for Great Bedwyn for the Happy Parliament, and was re-elected MP for Great Bedwyn in 1625. He was elected MP for Thirsk in 1626. He became an Ancient of Gray's Inn in 1638.

References

Year of birth missing
Year of death missing
Alumni of Magdalene College, Cambridge
English MPs 1624–1625
English MPs 1625
English MPs 1626